Tobaku Datenroku Kaiji: Kazuya-hen is the fourth part of the manga series Kaiji by Nobuyuki Fukumoto. It ran in Kodansha's seinen manga magazine Weekly Young Magazine from 2009 to 2013. Kodansha collected its chapters in ten tankōbon volumes, released from October 6, 2009, to July 5, 2013. It was followed by the fifth part, Tobaku Datenroku Kaiji: One Poker-hen.


Volume list

References

Kaiji manga chapter lists